Ritu Barmecha  is an Indian actress.

She starred, along with Allari Naresh, in the film Aha Naa Pellanta directed by Veerabhadram Chowdary. Her brothers Rajat Barmecha and Vicky are also pursuing careers in films.

Filmography 

Movies

Serials

References

External links 
 

Living people
Actresses from Delhi
Actresses in Telugu cinema
21st-century Indian actresses
Indian film actresses
Actresses in Hindi television
Indian television actresses
1988 births